Xing Rongjie (1911 – 20 November 1997) was an army Founding General in China.

Xing was born in Heipei, China and started his career in the army in 1933 as a Mission Commander of the Defend Group, which joined the Chinese Republic Army in 1937.

During the Second Sino-Japanese War, Xing served in the following capacities:
 worked as the Captain of Ji West Guerrillas
 served as Command Chief of Staff and Commander of the Third Detachment, Yu Ji.
 Chief of Staff of the Anti-Japanese Volunteer Army, Taihang Fifth Military Region
 Chief of Staff of the military subdistrict 34
 Chief of staff of the 8th Military Subdistrict

During the war of liberation, Xing served in the following capacities:
 District Chief of Staff of the Fifth Military Region of Daheng
 Chief of Staff of the Sixth Column 16 Jinjilushu Field Army Brigade
 Captain of Central Plains Area Military University 
 Commander of the 36th Dvivsion.

After the founding of the People's Republic of China, Xing:
 Became the Commander of the 3rd Corps
 Commander of the military subdistrict of East Sichuan Fuling Military Region
 Professor tactical trainers and Deputy Director of the Training Department of the Nanjing Military Academy
 Military attache of Socialist Republic of Vietnam Embassy
 Commander of Shaanxi Military District

In 1955, Xing was promoted to the rank of Major General, the first group of generals in China. He was listed one of the founding generals in China.

During his career, Xing was awarded the Medal of Freedom of Independent, and the Independent Liberation Medal.

1911 births
1997 deaths